The 1991 Athens Open was a men's tennis tournament played on outdoor clay courts in Athens, Greece that was part of the World Series of the 1991 ATP Tour. It was the sixth edition of the tournament and was held from 30 September until 7 October 1991. First-seeded Sergi Bruguera won the singles title.

Finals

Singles

 Sergi Bruguera defeated  Jordi Arrese 7–5, 6–3
 It was Bruguera's 4th title of the year and the 6th of his career.

Doubles

 Jacco Eltingh /  Mark Koevermans defeated  Menno Oosting /  Olli Rahnasto 5–7, 7–6, 7–5
 It was Eltingh's 2nd title of the year and the 2nd of his career. It was Koevermans' 1st title of the year and the 2nd of his career.

References

External links
 ITF tournament edition details

Athens Open
ATP Athens Open
Athens Open
September 1991 sports events in Europe
October 1991 sports events in Europe